One drop rhythm is a reggae style drum beat. 

Popularized by Carlton Barrett, long-time drummer of Bob Marley and the Wailers, the creator is disputed, and it has been attributed to drummers including Barrett, Carlton and his brother Aston, and Winston Grennan.

Characteristics 
The backbeat is characterized by the dominant snare drum stroke (usually a click produced by cross-sticking) and bass drum both sounding on the third beat of every four, while beat one is left empty. Thus, the expected hit on beat one is "dropped," creating the one-drop effect. Dropping out the bass on the "one" of the measure further accentuates the downbeat of the drums creating the rhythm.

This may be seen in the drum notation for the typical rock drum pattern:
  HH|x-x-x-x-x-x-x-x-||
   S|--------o-------||
   B|o---------------||
     1 + 2 + 3 + 4 +
and the one drop:
  HH|x-x-x-x-x-x-x-x-||
   S|--------x-------||
   B|--------o-------||
     1 + 2 + 3 + 4 +

Variations 
The rockers rhythm is the one drop with a steady bass drum on every eighth note, though one drop is slower than a ska pattern, and rockers is often slower than one drop.

The steppers rhythm is essentially the one drop with a steady bass drum on every quarter note.

Examples 
An instructive example of this drum beat is Bob Marley and the Wailers' song "One Drop" which talks about this rhythm.

Examples of songs using the one drop from Bob Marley and the Wailers' album Legend, with Carlton Barrett on drums, include: "No Woman, No Cry", "Three Little Birds", "Get Up, Stand Up", "Waiting in Vain", "Stir It Up", "One Love/People Get Ready", and "I Shot the Sheriff". Other examples include Peter Tosh's "Legalize It", Steel Pulse's "Higher Than High", and Bob Marley's "Exodus". Also The Upsetters's "One Step Dub" (1976) and Bob Marley & The Wailers's "Crazy Baldhead" (1976).

Examples of songs using the steppers from Legend include: "Is This Love", "Exodus", "Buffalo Soldier", "Satisfy My Soul", "Jamming". Other examples include Burning Spear's "Lion".

The one drop style has also been used and referenced in numerous non-reggae songs, including "Lucille Has Messed My Mind Up" by Frank Zappa, "The Spirit of Radio" by Rush, and "You Enjoy Myself" by Phish all placing their own twist on the one drop rhythm.

See also
Half time (music)

Ska stroke

Sources

Drum patterns
Percussion performance techniques
Reggae